Theodore Wilhelm Engstrom (1916–2006) was the head of Youth for Christ and World Vision International. The evangelical leader and author was known in part for instructing churches, parachurch ministries, and other non-profit organizations how to apply business concepts and achieve financial help. Engstrom was one of the founding architects of the Evangelical Council for Financial Accountability.

Theodore Wilhelm Engstrom was born on March 1, 1916, in Cleveland, Ohio. He professed his faith in Christ while a freshman at Taylor University in 1935., graduating in 1938 as an English and journalism major. Engstrom began his career with Zondervan Publishing House in the 1940s where he soon became editorial director and then general manager. In 1947 he directed a 10-day evangelistic crusade led by a young evangelist named Billy Graham. This developed into a lifelong friendship.

In 1951 Engstrom became executive director of Youth for Christ International. In 1963 he was recruited as executive vice president of World Vision International by Bob Pierce, that organization's founder. Engstrom served two years as president of the organization before retiring in 1987. In 1986 he was among the signers of "A MANIFESTO FOR THE
CHRISTIAN CHURCH" promoted by the "Coalition on Revival" which, for example, condemns a wide variety of sin on biblical grounds, including any extra-marital sexual relationships including homosexuality as social evil to be opposed.

Engstrom was a prolific writer, averaging a book a year for over 50 years plus numerous magazine and journal articles.

Ted Engstrom died July 14, 2006, at his home in Southern California. He was 90.

References

Leaders of Christian parachurch organizations
1916 births
2006 deaths
American evangelicals